Cappuccio is an Italian word, used for a type of headgear. It may refer to:
People
Alejandro Cappuccio (1976 -), Uruguayan football coach and notary 
Antonella Cappuccio (1944 -), Italian artist 
Ciccio Cappuccio (1842 – 1892), Italian Camorrista
 Ruggero Cappuccio (1964 -), Italian playwright
Wine
Nerello Cappuccio, an Italian variety of red wine grape